Hannah Beachler is an American production designer. She worked on the 2015 Rocky film Creed, the Miles Davis biopic Miles Ahead, and most recently has become known for the film Moonlight, Beyoncé's 2016 TV special and visual album Lemonade, and for her Afrofuturist design direction on the film Black Panther, for which she won an Academy Award for Best Production Design. She was the first African-American to be nominated in the category.

Early life and education
Beachler, the daughter of an architect and interior decorator, grew up in Centerville, Ohio, being surrounded by design for a long time. She graduated from the University of Cincinnati, studying fashion design. She attended Wright State University in Dayton, Ohio where she studied film.

Career
She first met Ryan Coogler working on his Fruitvale Station, a film about the shooting of Oscar Grant. It had a limited budget and required Beachler's creativity to come up with low-cost ideas; she used her own Bay Area Rapid Transit card that is seen in the visor of a car Grant is driving. Fruitvale Station won the Grand Jury Prize for Best Film and the Audience Award for Best Film at the Sundance Film Festival in 2013.

For Creed, Beachler watched the first four Rocky films for inspiration. She was responsible for designing Front Street Gym that appears prominently in the film. She visited a number of gyms across the United States, but particularly in Philadelphia where the film series is based, in order to get a good idea of what the set should look like. She designed the entire gym including the professionally-sized boxing ring, and her plans ensured that cameras could get a 360-degree view of everything. In her efforts, she was able to transform a hall within Temple University, into the realistic gym that was seen in the film.

For the outdoor scenes in Miles Ahead, Beachler searched through numerous photograph archives to accurately capture the scenes in New York City from the 1950s to the 1970s, but ultimately took inspiration from some silent film shot from a car window, that was posted on YouTube decades later. She used no stage shots in the entire film; the set of Davis' home was a disused church in Cincinnati that was gutted and renovated to resemble a multi-layer house including a basement recording studio.

As the production designer on Marvel Studios's Black Panther, Beachler oversaw a $30 million art budget and a crew of several hundred people. Beachler is the first-ever female production designer of a Marvel film, and was the second person hired for it behind director Ryan Coogler. To research the project, she first spent time in Cape Town, South Africa, and then traveled the region with the rest of the crew to get a sense of the countryside and cultures represented there. Before beginning the process of working on Black Panther with Coogler, Beachler did not believe she would have this " once in a lifetime opportunity," but to prove herself she worked hard and even ended up spending $12,000 of her own money to prove her capability.   "It’s all different, and they’re different countries..." Beachler explained: "you can’t represent everything, but I can certainly interpret the fact that there are so many different things within [its fictional country of] Wakanda and within that one culture." For her work on Black Panther, Beachler became the first African-American to be nominated for the Academy Award for Best Production Design, as well as the first to win the category.

Beachler was lead curator for the Metropolitan Museum of Art exhibition, Before Yesterday We Could Fly: An Afrofuturist Period Room, which opened in 2021. Working with commissioners such as Njideka Akunyili Crosby and Jenn Nkiru , she designed this space in hopes that it would embody, "Black imagination, excellence, and self-determination...".

Filmography
 Fruitvale Station (2013)
 The Town That Dreaded Sundown (2014)
 Creed (2015)
 Miles Ahead (2015)
 Lemonade (2016)
 Moonlight (2016) 
 Black Panther (2018)
 Dark Waters (2019)
Black Is King (2020)
 No Sudden Move (2021)
 Black Panther: Wakanda Forever (2022)

Awards and nominations

References

External links
 
 

Living people
People from Centerville, Ohio
University of Cincinnati alumni
Wright State University alumni
American production designers
Best Art Direction Academy Award winners
Year of birth missing (living people)
Women production designers